Kněžnice is a municipality and village in Jičín District in the Hradec Králové Region of the Czech Republic. It has about 300 inhabitants.

Administrative parts
The village of Javornice is an administrative part of Kněžnice.

Geography
It lies mostly in the Jičín Uplands. The Libuňka Stream springs here and flows across the municipality. The southern part of the territory lies in the Bohemian Paradise Protected Landscape Area.

References

Villages in Jičín District